Labeo horie, the Assuan labeo, is a fish in the genus Labeo which is found in the Blue Nile and the White Nile, including  Lake Albert, Lake Kyoga and Lake Turkana.

References 

Labeo
Cyprinid fish of Africa
Fish described in 1847